Lett may refer to:

Lett, archaic word for a Latvian
Lettish, another name for the Latvian language

Lett as a surname may refer to the following:

Alleyne Lett (born 1983), Grenadian decathlete
Barbara Lett-Simmons (born 1927), American politician
Benjamin Lett (1813–1858), Irish-Canadian filibusterer
Dan Lett, Canadian actor
David Lett (1939-2008), founder and winemaker for The Eyrie Vineyards in Oregon
Evelyn Lett (1896-1999), Canadian women's rights pioneer
Henry William Lett (1836–1920), Irish botanist
Leon Lett (born 1968), former American Football defensive tackle
Michael Lett (born 1987), Rugby League player who plays for the Sydney Roosters in the National Rugby League (NRL) competition
Sherwood Lett (1895–1964), Canadian soldier, lawyer, diplomat, and jurist
Steven Lett (born 1958), American diplomat and chief executive of the International Cospas-Sarsat Programme in Montreal, Canada
Lett's Brewery (officially Mill Park Brewery), a beer manufacturer based in Enniscorthy, County Wexford, Ireland
William Pittman Lett, Irish-Canadian journalist

See also
Letts (disambiguation)